Vaprio d'Agogna is a comune (municipality) in the Province of Novara in the Italian region Piedmont, located about  northeast of Turin and about  northwest of Novara.

Vaprio d'Agogna borders the following municipalities: Barengo, Cavaglietto, Mezzomerico, Momo, Oleggio, and Suno

History

In the area of today's municipality of Vaprio, the first simple autochthonous people probably settled in pre-Roman times. The first important expansion occurred, however, in the period between the fourth and second century BC. when numerous tribes of Celtic origin belonging to the people of Vertamocori arrived in the Novara area. It was these people who gave rise to the first real settlement of Vaprio. The name of the town itself derives from a Gallic term, "Wabero", which would have summarized the meaning of "narrow valley with a sunken river". In fact, as some findings also show, the primaeval settlement was located slightly further east than the current Vaprio (Vavrina locality), in a hilly area centred around the Terdoppio river, one of the main rivers passing through the Novara area.
The findings of funeral remains and ordinary objects from the period confirms the importance of the Celts in the creation of this village and of the own culture of its inhabitants even nowadays(in this area are still spoken local variants of Gallo-italic languages, that had an important contribution by Gauls) Later, however, with the Roman colonization that had slowly decentralized the settlement and due to constant floods of the same double, the population of ancient Vaprio moved to the flat and more fertile area where the village is still located today. The Roman influence was demonstrated thanks to the finding, during the construction of the local castle in the XII-XIV century, of a Roman votive altar dedicated to "Giove Ottimo Massimo", Jupiter; in fact, it was preserved intact in the walls of the ancient church that once stood where the castle was built. The siliceous stone was then donated in 1820 to the cathedral of Novara. Being a small enough decentralized settlement, Vaprio never experienced a large expansion. In medieval times it was assigned to the Committee of Pombia; it then passed under the Counts of Biandrate in 1152, and from that period followed the fate of a larger neighbouring municipality, Momo. In 1402 the Duke of Milan Gian Galeazzo Visconti handed over the village to the nobleBarbavara who then sold it to Cristoforo di Casate. Then, in 1534, Vaprio was sold for 16,800 lire(local money) to the lord of - Fontaneto d'Agogna, Galeazzo Visconti, remaining under this family until the early nineteenth century. In the Baroque period Vaprio experienced a slight expansion, so much so that a small religious brotherhood was established in the municipality and founded a modest monastery; today, however, nothing remains of it. In the seventeenth century, the town became a minor possession of the Caccia family, under which some important changes took place in the local castle. They were also the first commissioners to build the new church of Vaprio, which replaced the previous one, smaller and older, which was located within the castle walls.
The most famous member of the family, Gian Battista Caccia(called Cacìta by vapriese, because he wasn't really tall) is said to have inspired the main antagonist of Alessandro Manzoni's I Promessi Sposi.

In the early nineteenth century, numerous agricultural lands of Vaprio were purchased by two new wealthy families, the Bono and the Acerbi. Thanks also to them, the irrigation system of the surrounding territories was expanded, with the creation of new channels and cables in order to make the best use of the natural waters of the area. The two families, which no longer exist today, are commemorated in the cemetery of Vaprio by two imposing tombs: that of the Acerbi, a high sepulchre closed on the sides by massive railings, has a finely frescoed ceiling; the funerary monument also shows the representations of the main components, among which Baldassare Acerbi, the most important member, stands out and above them is the name of the family, Acerbi-Bertone (the latter were another family still existing, joined to the Acerbi). The Bono family is instead remembered by a stepped tomb in which Gaudenzio Bono, a member of the famous "Mille" Garibaldi who died in 1867, is buried in the battle of Mentana. In the mid-nineteenth century, the town experienced a significant population growth: the inhabitants were mainly employed in agriculture, but there were also numerous craftsmen. Until 1863, the name of the place was simply Vaprio, but through a royal decree issued by King Vittorio Emanuele II it was changed to Vaprio d'Agogna, in order to distinguish it from the Lombard municipality of Vaprio d'Adda.

References

Cities and towns in Piedmont